Smith Island is a small rocky island near Avila Beach, California. It was settled in the late 19th century and is currently uninhabited. The island is near the former settlement of Port Harford, California.

References 

Islands of California
Pacific islands of California